The Apple Type Services for Unicode Imaging (ATSUI) is the set of services for rendering Unicode-encoded text introduced in Mac OS 8.5  and carried forward into Mac OS X.

It replaced the WorldScript engine for legacy encodings.

Obsolescence 

ATSUI was replaced by a faster and modern Unicode imaging engine called Core Text in Mac OS X 10.5 (Leopard).

The framework was officially deprecated with Xcode 4.6, which was released in December 2012: "Source code using ATS APIs will generate warnings while being compiled. For 10.8, there will be no loss of functionality but there could be areas where performance will suffer. Programmers are instructed to replace all their ATS code (including ATSUI) with CoreText as ATS functionality will be completely removed in future releases of OS X."

However, it was actually removed in September 2022 for source code targeting only macOS 13 Ventura, and will be totally removed in macOS 14.

References

External links 
 Home page

Unicode
Application programming interfaces
Macintosh operating systems
macOS APIs
Text rendering libraries